Robert Ambrose (1855 – 13 June 1940) was an Irish politician.

Born in Newcastle West in County Limerick, the son of Michael Ambrose and Eliza Quaide, he was educated at Wier's School and Queen's College, Cork.  He qualified as a surgeon and set up a practice in the East End of London.  Despite this, he stood in the West Mayo by-election, 1893 for the anti-Parnellite Irish National Federation and was elected, holding his seat in the 1895, 1900 and 1906 general elections.  He decided not to stand in January 1910, and instead became involved with the British Labour Party, for which he stood unsuccessfully in Whitechapel and St Georges at the 1918 general election.

Ambrose wrote A Plea for Industrial Regeneration of Ireland, published in 1909.  His cousin, Daniel Ambrose, also served as an anti-Parnellite MP. Another first cousin, was John Wolfe Ambrose, the man is commemorated in the Ambrose Tunnel in New York.

References

1855 births
1940 deaths
Alumni of University College Cork
Anti-Parnellite MPs
Irish surgeons
Members of the Parliament of the United Kingdom for County Mayo constituencies (1801–1922)
People from Newcastle West
UK MPs 1892–1895
UK MPs 1895–1900
UK MPs 1900–1906
UK MPs 1906–1910
Labour Party (UK) parliamentary candidates